Yuzhoupliosaurus is an extinct genus of plesiosaur from the Middle Jurassic of China. The genus is known only from a lower jaw, a vertebra, and fragments of a pectoral girdle. It is believed this genus lived in fresh water.

Etymology
The genus was named after Yuzhou (渝州), the previous name of Chungking, a major city on the Yangtze River  where the first fossil of  Yuzhoupliosaurus was found.

Description
Paleontologists believe Yuzhoupliosaurus to have been approximatively 4 meters long. The lower jaw contains five pairs of large teeth and 23 or 24 smaller teeth. The cervical vertebra are considered "high and short". The anterior cervical ribs are double-headed while the posterior cervical ribs are single-headed. The coracoids are elongated and the clavicles are well developed.

See also
 List of plesiosaur genera
 Timeline of plesiosaur research

Sources

Middle Jurassic plesiosaurs
Plesiosaurs of Asia
Jurassic China
Prehistoric animals of China
Sauropterygian genera